The Archdiocese of Atlanta is a Latin Church ecclesiastical jurisdiction, or archdiocese, of the Catholic Church in the United States. Its territory contains Georgia's northern counties, including the capital of Atlanta. The archdiocese is led by a prelate archbishop, who also serves as pastor of the mother church, the Cathedral of Christ the King in Atlanta. 

The cathedral is the metropolitan see of the Catholic Ecclesiastical Province of Atlanta, which covers Georgia, South Carolina, and North Carolina. The archdiocese reported 102 parishes and missions, and 1,200,000 registered Catholics, .

History

Early history 
Catholic settlement began in Georgia in the 1700's with the establishment of a Catholic mission by Catholic settlers who had moved to Georgia from Baltimore.  The territory of the present state of Georgia passed to the Prefecture Apostolic of the United States/Diocese of Baltimore in 1784, the Diocese of Charleston in 1820, and Diocese of Savannah in 1850. Pope Pius XI renamed the Diocese of Savannah to the Diocese of Savannah-Atlanta on January 5, 1937.

Establishment
Pope Pius XII erected the Diocese of Atlanta, taking its territory from the Diocese of Savannah-Atlanta and concurrently changing the title of the latter back to Diocese of Savannah, on July 2, 1956. He designated the Co-Cathedral of Christ the King in Atlanta as the cathedral church of the new diocese.

Pope John XXIII elevated the Diocese of Atlanta to the present Metropolitan Archdiocese of Atlanta, designating the Diocese of Savannah, the Diocese of Charleston (South Carolina), the Diocese of Raleigh (North Carolina), and the Territorial Abbey of Mary Help of Christians, popularly known as "Belmont Abbey," as its suffragans, on 10 February 1962.

Pope Paul VI erected the Diocese of Charlotte, taking its initial territory from the Diocese of Raleigh and designating it as an additional suffragan of the Metropolitan Archdiocese of Atlanta, on 12 November 1971.  The same pope subsequently annexed the entire territory of the Territorial Abbey of Mary Help of Christians to the Diocese of Charlotte, thus terminating the status of that abbey as a territorial abbey and as a suffragan of the Metropolitan Archdiocese of Atlanta, on January 1, 1977.  These actions established the present configuration of the Metropolitan Province of Atlanta.

Reports of sexual abuse
In December 2018, a former altar boy filed a lawsuit against the Archdiocese of Atlanta alleged that the archdiocese shielded a priest who sexually abused him On April 1, 2019, the Archdiocese of Atlanta published a list of 23 Catholic clergy who served in the archdiocese and were "credibly accused" of committing acts of sexual abuse since the founding of the archdiocese in 1956.

Selected leadership history
In 1966, the archdiocese was home to the youngest bishop in the nation, Joseph Bernardin.  Ordained an auxiliary bishop at the age of 38, Bernardin later became archbishop of Cincinnati and ultimately the archbishop of Chicago and cardinal.

In 1988, Eugene Marino was named archbishop of Atlanta, becoming the first African American archbishop in the United States.  He resigned from his position two years later after his affair – termed an "inappropriate relationship" by the archdiocese – with a lay minister became public knowledge.  After a period of what was termed reflection and renewal, Marino continued on in religious service in New York State until his death.

In December 2004, Pope John Paul II appointed Wilton Gregory as archbishop of the Archdiocese of Atlanta; and he was installed in January 2005.

In July 2009, Pope Benedict XVI, recognizing Archbishop Gregory's need for assistance in governing the burgeoning archdiocese, named Monsignor Luis Zarama as the second auxiliary bishop of Atlanta.  In April 2013, Monsignor David Talley was installed as an additional auxiliary bishop of Atlanta.

On April 4, 2019, Pope Francis transferred Archbishop Wilton Gregory to the office of archbishop of Washington. The see of Atlanta became vacant upon the installation of Archbishop Gregory in his new office on 21 May 2019.  The College of Consultors elected Auxiliary Bishop Joel Konzen as the diocesan administrator three days later.  Pope Francis subsequently appointed Gregory Hartmayer, then bishop of Savannah, as the new archbishop of Atlanta on March 5, 2020, with his installation taking place on May 6, 2020.  Pope Francis also appointed Archbishop Gregory a cardinal in a consistory on November, 20, 2020, making him the first African-American cardinal.

Population
The archdiocese said that the number of Catholics grew from 30,840 members in 1960 to 292,300 members in 1998 and to 900,000 members in 2010, an increase of 207 percent. The population is estimated by the USCCB to exceed 1 million by 2011, with an overall increase of 2,500 people.  The increase is fueled by Catholics moving to Atlanta from other parts of the U.S. and the world, and from newcomers to the church. About 11 percent of all metropolitan Atlanta residents are Catholic.

Territory
In 2020, the archdiocese included 102 parishes and missions.

Bishops

The following is a list of the bishops and archbishops who have served as the diocesan bishop of Atlanta (and their tenures of service):

Bishop of Atlanta
 Francis Edward Hyland (1956–1962)

Archbishops of Atlanta
 Paul John Hallinan (1962–1968)
 Thomas Andrew Donnellan (1968–1987)
 Eugene Antonio Marino (1988–1990)
 James Patterson Lyke (1991–1992)
 John Francis Donoghue (1993–2004)
 Wilton Daniel Gregory (2004–2019), appointed archbishop of Washington (elevated to cardinal in 2020)
 Gregory John Hartmayer (2020–present)

Auxiliary Bishops of Atlanta
 Joseph Bernardin (1966–1968), appointed general secretary of the U.S. Conference of Catholic Bishops; later appointed archbishop of Cincinnati and archbishop of Chicago (elevated to cardinal in 1983)
 Luis Rafael Zarama (2009–2017), appointed bishop of Raleigh
 David Talley (2013–2016), appointed Bishop of Alexandria; later appointed bishop of Memphis in 2019
 Bernard Shlesinger (2017–present)
 Joel Matthias Konzen (2018–present)
 John-Nhan Tran (2023–present)

Other priests in this archdiocese who became bishops
 Eusebius J. Beltran (1960-1978), appointed bishop of Tulsa; later appointed archbishop of Oklahoma City in 1993

Schools

The archdiocese operates eighteen elementary and high schools. Additionally, there are six independent Catholic schools (as noted in the lists to follow) located in the Atlanta metropolitan area.  While those six schools are independent, they fall within the jurisdiction of the archdiocese.  The population of student enrollment in all of the Catholic schools in the archdiocese in 2011–2012 was approximately 12,000.  The superintendent of the schools in the archdiocese is currently Hal Plummer.

K-12 schools 
 Holy Spirit Preparatory School, (Atlanta and Sandy Springs), Independent
 Notre Dame Academy, Duluth, Independent
 Pinecrest Academy, Cumming, Independent
St. Johns The Evangelist Catholic school, Hapeville

7-12 schools 
 Marist School, Brookhaven, Independent

High schools 

 Blessed Trinity Catholic High School, Roswell
 Cristo Rey Atlanta Jesuit High School, Atlanta, Independent
 Monsignor Donovan Catholic High School, Athens, Independent
 Our Lady of Mercy Catholic High School, Fayetteville
 St. Pius X Catholic High School, DeKalb County

Georgia Bulletin
The Georgia Bulletin, the official newspaper of the archdiocese, was established in 1963 and is published weekly (except for the second and last weeks of June, July, August, as well as the last week of December).

See also

 Ecclesiastical Province of Atlanta
 Historical list of the Catholic bishops of the United States
 List of Roman Catholic archdioceses (by country and continent)
 List of Roman Catholic Churches in the Archdiocese of Atlanta
 List of Roman Catholic dioceses (alphabetical) (including archdioceses)
 List of Roman Catholic dioceses (structured view) (including archdioceses)
 Roman Catholic Archbishop of Atlanta

References

External links
Roman Catholic Archdiocese of Atlanta Official Site

Catholic Hierarchy Profile of the Archdiocese of Atlanta
Places of traditional Catholic masses St Pius V of Atlanta

 
Archdiocese of Atlanta
Christian organizations established in 1962
 
Roman Catholic dioceses and prelatures established in the 20th century
Roman Catholic dioceses in the United States
1962 establishments in Georgia (U.S. state)
Christianity in Atlanta